Patrick William Simpson Waddington (19 August 19014 February 1987) was an English actor, educated at Gresham's School at Holt in Norfolk. He was born and died in York, England.

Biography
Waddington was the grandson of William Waddington, the piano manufacturer who also took over the management of the Theatre Royal York. After Gresham's School and St John's College, Oxford, he started his career singing, and in the 1930s was in That Certain Trio with Peggy Cochrane.  On stage from 1924, often in upper-class roles, his theatre work included the original West End run of Patrick Hamilton's Rope in 1929; a lengthy tour of My Fair Lady, as Colonel Pickering, in 1963–5; and the musical Kean on Broadway, in 1961. Film and TV included The Wooden Horse (1950), A Night to Remember (1958), and two episodes of Dad's Army, as 'The Brigadier'.

In 1951 he became General Secretary of TACT (The Actors Charitable Trust) and was headmaster of its children's home, Silverlands, until 1953.  A plaque to commemorate him can be seen in the Courtyard entrance to the Merchant Adventurers' Hall in York - he was a member of the Company of Merchant Adventurers of the City of York from 1933 to his death in 1987.  In 1986, he self-published his autobiography, Patrick: Or, That Awful Warning.

Filmography 

 If Youth But Knew (1926) - Arthur Noel-Vane
 Loyalties (1933) - Augustus Borring
 The Loves of Madame Dubarry (1935) - René
 The Black Tulip (1937) - Cornelus Van Baerle
 Journey Together (1945) - Flight Lt Mander
 Gaiety George (1946) - Lt Travers
 School for Secrets (1946) - Group Captain Aspinall
 The Clouded Crystal (1948) - Jack
 It's Not Cricket (1949) - Valentine Christmas
 That Dangerous Age (1949) - Rosley
 Stop Press Girl (1949) - Airline Director (uncredited)
 The Wooden Horse (1950) - Senior British Officer
 The fire lake where the old man walks (1956)
 Wideawake (1957) - Male, senior
 The White Cliffs Mystery (1957) - Matrion
 O.S.S.: Operation Big House (1957) - German Ambassador
 Rx Murder (1958) - Sir George Watson
 The Moonraker (1958) - Lord Dorset
 A Night to Remember (1958) - Sir Richard
 Battle of the V-1 (1958) - Air Marshal (uncredited)
 Play of the Week: Mary Stuart (1960) - Leicester
 Naked City: The Man Who Bit a Diamond in Half (1960) - Mitcham
 The Jazz Age: The Outstation (1968) - Lord Hollington
 Armchair Theatre: The Mandarins (1969) - Sir Henry
 Dad's Army: The Showing Up of Corporal Jones (1968) - The Brigadier
 Dad's Army: The Loneliness of the Long Distance Walker (1969) (Lost) - The  Brigadier
 Department S: Who Plays the Dummy? (1969) - NATO General

Bibliography

References

External links 
 

1901 births
1987 deaths
Alumni of St John's College, Oxford
Male actors from York
English male stage actors
English male film actors
English male television actors
People educated at Gresham's School
20th-century English male actors